Misamis Oriental's at-large congressional district is an obsolete congressional district of the Philippines that encompassed the entire province of Misamis Oriental. It was created ahead of the 1931 Philippine House of Representatives elections following the 1929 division of Misamis into two provinces. The district elected one member in each of the final two meetings of the Philippine Assembly from 1931 to 1935 and in the two meetings of Commonwealth National Assembly from 1935 to 1941.

Two members represented the district in the Second Republic National Assembly from 1943 to 1944. It returned to a single-member constituency for the restored House of Representatives in both the Commonwealth Congress from 1945 to 1946 and all seven meetings post-independence until 1972. The district was last contested at the 1984 Philippine parliamentary election when its capital city of Cagayan de Oro also began to elect its own separate representative. It was abolished following the 1987 reapportionment under a new constitution.

Representation history

See also
Legislative districts of Misamis Oriental

References

Former congressional districts of the Philippines
Politics of Misamis Oriental
1929 establishments in the Philippines
1986 disestablishments in the Philippines
At-large congressional districts of the Philippines
Congressional districts of Northern Mindanao
Constituencies established in 1929
Constituencies disestablished in 1972
Constituencies established in 1984
Constituencies disestablished in 1986